The Key tegu (Echinosaura keyi ) is a species of lizard in the family Gymnophthalmidae. The species is endemic to Ecuador.

Taxonomy
Echinosaura keyi was formerly known as Teuchocercus keyi , and was the type species of the genus Teuchocercus, but the genus Teuchocercus is no longer recognized.

Etymology
The specific name, keyi, is in honor of American physician and amateur herpetologist George Key (1942-1999).

Geographic range
The Key tegu is only found in Ecuador with records from Esmeraldas and Pichincha.

References

Further reading
Torres-Carvajal, Omar; Lobos, Simón E.; Venegas, Pablo J.; Chávez, Germán; Aguirre-Peñafiel, Vanessa; Zurita, Daniel; Echevarría, Lourdes Y. (2016). "Phylogeny and biogeography of the most diverse clade of South American gymnophthalmid lizards (Squamata, Gymnophthalmidae, Cercosaurinae)". Molecular Phylogenetics and Evolution 99: 63-75. (Echinosaura keyi, new combination).

Reptiles of Ecuador
Endemic fauna of Ecuador
Reptiles described in 1969
Taxa named by Thomas H. Fritts
Taxa named by Hobart Muir Smith
Echinosaura